"Honey, Let Me Sing You a Song" is a song by American pop-rock singer-songwriter Matt Hires from his first full-length studio album Take Us to the Start, the song featured in many uses in media, including ABC's hit show Cougar Town and Life Unexpected on The CW.

The demo version featured in the soundtrack album of 2010 Touchstone Pictures release, When in Rome and 2008 release Live From the Hotel Café EP.

Matt has recorded an alternate version of "Honey, Let Me Sing You a Song", which featured on his 2010 release A to B EP.

A live version of "Honey, Let Me Sing You a Song" features on his 2011 release Live Sessions EP.

Background
According to an interview with Mike Ragogna, Matt said the song was written for his wife Rachel.

Music video concept

Reception

Critical response
The song has received generally favorable reviews from music critics.
"The album’s song, “Honey, Let Me Sing You A Song," begins quietly then bursts into the chorus as Hires begs his lady not to run away, to listen to his words (as they come out wrong). It's sweeping and expressive, but – as cute as Hires is – watching the completely unrelated music video kinda warps the experience." —Creative Loafing

"The lead off track is “Honey, Let Me Sing You A Song," which Hires gave us a little taste of in the form of an acoustic demo on his "Live From The Hotel Cafe" EP. This is the song that will make him a household name, and should be all over the radio and at the top of the charts in no time at all." —This Is Modern

"...Hires requests, “Honey, Let Me Sing You a Song". With his folky pop and aching croon, how could you deny him?" —People Magazine

Versions
from "Take Us to the Start"

from "Live From the Hotel Café EP" / "When In Rome OST"

from "A to B EP"

from "Live Sessions EP"

References 

2009 debut singles
Songs written by Gregg Wattenberg
2009 songs
Songs written by Eric Rosse
Atlantic Records singles
Song recordings produced by Eric Rosse